The Barratt's warbler or African scrub warbler (Bradypterus barratti), is a species of Old World warbler in the family Locustellidae. It is found in eastern South Africa, Lesotho, eastern Zimbabwe and adjacent western Mozambique. Its natural habitat is subtropical or tropical moist montane forests.

Taxonomy and systematics 
Bradypterus barratti was described by Sharpe in 1876 from the Mac Mac goldfields, Mashishing, Mpumalanga. Barratts Warbler has been regarded as conspecific with the Evergreen Forest Warbler (Bradypterus lopezi). However, they differ in voice and morphology. Currently the Barratts Warbler is considered polytypic with four races being recognized: B. b. barratti, B. b. godfreyi, B. b. priesti and B. b. cathkinensis.

Identification 
15 cm in size and their average weight is 15g. Males and females are alike. Adults: The underparts of these birds are chocolate  brown their crown to tail, rump and tail are washed rufous. They have dark brown lores, cheeks and ears coverts and their supercilium is greyish buff. Their upper wings coverts rufous-brown and marginal part of the upper wing is buffy. Primaries are  rufous-brown with cinnamon-brown outer webs. Secondaries rufous-brown with cinnamon brown. Their axillaries and underwings are ashy brown. Throat and chin are buffy white, with their throat streaked dark brown. At the centre of their breast and belly is white, streaked with grey. They have brownish olive undertail, thighs and flanks. Their eyes are hazel-brown or pale to dark brown. They have black bills and their legs and feet are dark brown. Measurements: B. b. barratti wing 60–68 cm; tail 60–69 cm; tarsus 18–21 cm; culmen 11–13 cm. Juveniles: There is a lack of knowledge known about juvenile characteristics. Juveniles have shorter tails, upper parts are more olive than adults and their supercilium and underparts are yellow.

Confused species: The Barratts Warbler is very similar and confused with Knysna Warbler since their distributions overlap but they have shorter tails and less streaked below. Their songs are also similar but the opening of the Knysna Warbler is longer, louder and discrete.

Geographic variation and distribution 
Endemic to southern Africa. Patchy, in eastern highlands of Zimbabwe. Historically reported from adjacent Mozambique. Also from Zoutpansberg, Limpopo Province, KwaZulu-Natal and Lesotho and to about Grahamstown in the Eastern Cape. The variation involves differences in plumage and the extent of throat streaking and size:

 B. b. priesti (E Zimbabwe) Much paler than other races. Throat and upper breast has short grey-brown streaks.
 B. b. barratti (NE South Africa) Throat and belly are greyer (less white). There streaking extends from throat to chin into the breast.
 B. b. godfreyi (Lowland SE South Africa) Looks similar to barratti, but it is slightly darker. Their underparts are grey-buff and their streaking is less distinct and prominent on the throat. The subspecies was named after Robert Godfrey (1872-1948).
 B. b. cathkinensis (Highlands of Drakensberg and Lesotho) More olive-brown than the nominate. Streaking on the throat and upper breast, larger than other races.

Habitat 
Dense tangled scrub, bracken (Pteridium sp), brambles (Smilax spp and alien Rubus spp) and heath (Erica spp) along streams, in clearings and in edges of forest and plantations.

Movement and migrations 
Birds may leave their breeding sites during the colder winter months. The birds from Zimbabwe move east to Mozambique lowlands. Birds from Drakensberg and KwaZulu-Natal interior may move to the coast. Migrates in winter to lower altitudes, as far as the coast in the Eastern Cape.

Voice 
Song starts with high pitched notes tik, tik, tik...., followed by lower notes speeding up to a trill. Alarm call a quiet chrr-chrr.

Foraging and food 
Little is known. Forages in or close to ground, running mouse-like. Eat insects, including crickets.

Behaviour 
The males sing near the nest during the breeding period. Usually solitary or in pairs. Remains on or near the ground, climbs agilely among vegetation.

Breeding habits 
They are monogamous, solitary nesting and territorial animals. Nest: Are made up of plant debris, twigs, grass and leaves placed on the ground or low down, between branches. Nest diam is 129 mm; cup diam 52 mm, depth 55mm. Laying dates: Zimbabwe: October (2), November (3), December (2); KwaZulu-Natal: September and November; Eastern Cape: November (1). Eggs: The clutch is  two eggs. The eggs are oval, pinkish-white, with dashes of brown and greys. Incubation period is unknown. Development and care of hatchlings and juveniles: Newly hatch young has not description. Nestlings fed by both adults.

References

External links
 Barratt's warbler - Species text in The Atlas of Southern African Birds.

Bradypterus
Birds of Southern Africa
Birds described in 1876
Taxa named by Richard Bowdler Sharpe
Taxonomy articles created by Polbot